Desert Botanical Garden is a  botanical garden located in Papago Park, at 1201 N. Galvin Parkway in Phoenix, central Arizona.

Founded by the Arizona Cactus and Native Flora Society in 1937 and established at this site in 1939, the garden now has more than 50,000 plants in more than 4,000 taxa, one-third of which are native to the area, including 379 species, which are rare, threatened or endangered.

Of special note are the rich collections of agave (4,026 plants in 248 taxa) and cacti (13,973 plants in 1,320 taxa), especially the Opuntia sub-family. Plants from less extreme climate conditions are protected under shadehouses. It focuses on plants adapted to desert conditions, including an Australian collection, a Baja California collection and a South American collection. Several ecosystems are represented: a mesquite bosque, semi-desert grassland, and upland chaparral.

Desert Botanical Garden has been designated as a Phoenix Point of Pride.

History
In the 1930s, a small group of local citizens became interested in conserving the fragile desert environment. One was Swedish botanist Gustaf Starck, who found like-minded residents by posting a sign, “Save the desert,” with an arrow pointing to his home. In April 1934 they formed the Arizona Cactus and Native Flora Society (ACNFS) to sponsor a botanical garden to encourage an understanding, appreciation and promotion of the uniqueness of the world's deserts, particularly the local Sonoran Desert.

Eventually Gertrude Webster, whose home encompassed all of what is today the neighborhood of Arcadia, joined the Society. She offered her encouragement, connections and financial support to establish the botanical garden in Papago Park. Margaret Bell Douglas provided support as well, donating 1,500 specimens to the herbarium.

Webster served as president of the Society's first Board of Directors and Gustaf Starck, W. E. Walker, Rell Hasket, L. L. Kreigbaum, and Samuel Wilson were the five vice president. The latter also served as Treasurer. Paul G. Olsen was Secretary. In 1938, after much work by the ACNFS, the board hired the Garden's first executive director, George Lindsay, who oversaw the first planting on the grounds. The Desert Botanical Garden opened in 1939 as a non-profit museum dedicated to research, education, conservation and display of desert plants.

Education and art 
The Garden offers specialized tours, workshops and lectures on desert landscaping and horticulture, nature art and photography, health and wellness.

The Garden presents Spring and Fall open-air acoustic concert series, art exhibitions, and Las Noches de las Luminarias since 1978. The Luminarias Festival became a Southwestern Holiday tradition featuring live music by the flickering lights of 8000 hand-lit luminaria.

Volunteerism

Volunteers were essential in the Garden's creation and development, when the staff was small and finances tight. These early supporters, including a few amateur botanists who donated their own plant collections, helped plan and execute plant sales, photography and art exhibits, and numerous public events.

Volunteers remain a Garden asset, sharing their time, talents and professional expertise. They work closely with staff to maintain the Garden's status as a premier plant research institution and serve as members of the Board of Trustees, setting policy and governing the Garden.

Gallery

See also

List of botanical gardens and arboretums in Arizona
List of historic properties in Phoenix, Arizona
List of botanical gardens in the United States

References

External links

Botanical gardens in Arizona
Butterfly houses
.
North American desert flora
Phoenix Points of Pride
Institutions accredited by the American Alliance of Museums
Tourist attractions in Phoenix, Arizona
Cactus gardens